This is a list of Members of Parliament (MPs) elected to the House of Commons at the 2001 general election, held on 7 June.

The list is arranged by constituency. New MPs elected since the general election and changes in party allegiance are noted at the bottom of the page.

Notable newcomers to the House of Commons included David Cameron, David Miliband, Boris Johnson, John Thurso, George Osborne, Nigel Dodds, Chris Grayling, Andy Burnham, Adam Price, Alistair Carmichael, Angus Robertson, Chris Bryant, Norman Lamb, and Tom Watson (many of whom would go on to reach senior positions in government and/or their respective parties).

During the 2001–05 Parliament, Michael Martin was the Speaker, Tony Blair served as Prime Minister, and William Hague, Iain Duncan Smith and Michael Howard served as Leader of the Opposition. This Parliament was dissolved on 11 April 2005.

By nation 

 List of MPs for constituencies in Northern Ireland (2001–2005)
 List of MPs for constituencies in Scotland (2001–2005)
 List of MPs for constituencies in Wales (2001–2005)

Composition 
These representative diagrams show the composition of the parties in the 2001 general election.

Note: The Scottish National Party and Plaid Cymru sit together as a party group, while Sinn Féin has not taken its seats. This is not the official seating plan of the House of Commons, which has five rows of benches on each side, with the government party to the right of the Speaker and opposition parties to the left, but with room for only around two-thirds of MPs to sit at any one time.

The effective government majority was slightly higher because Sinn Féin members do not take up their seats and the speaker does not vote. Speaker Michael Martin technically represented Labour in a notional majority.


By-elections 
See the list of United Kingdom by-elections.

Changes

2001 
Paul Marsden (Shrewsbury and Atcham) - Joined the Liberal Democrats from Labour on 10 December

2002 
Andrew Hunter (Basingstoke) - resigned the Conservative whip on 2 October

2003 
Martin Smyth (Belfast South), David Burnside (South Antrim), and Jeffrey Donaldson (Lagan Valley) - Resigned the Ulster Unionist whip on 23 June
George Galloway (Glasgow Kelvin) - Expelled from the Labour Party 23 October

2004 
Jeffrey Donaldson (Lagan Valley) - Joined the Democratic Unionist Party on 5 January
Martin Smyth (Belfast South) and David Burnside (South Antrim) - Resumed taking the Ulster Unionist Whip on 9 January
George Galloway (Glasgow Kelvin) - Formed RESPECT The Unity Coalition on 25 January
Ann Winterton (Congleton) - Conservative whip was withdrawn on 25 February and restored on 31 March.
Andrew Hunter (Basingstoke) - Took the Democratic Unionist Party whip on 10 December

2005 
Robert Jackson (Wantage) - Joined the Labour Party from the Conservatives on 15 January
Jonathan Sayeed (Mid Bedfordshire) - Conservative whip temporarily suspended on 3 February to 7 March; whip permanently suspended later in March
Howard Flight (Arundel and South Downs) - Conservative whip was withdrawn on 25 March.
 Paul Marsden (Shrewsbury and Atcham) - Resigned from the Liberal Democrats and declared his support for Labour on 5 April.

References

External links 
Find out about your MP and how they have voted with The Guardian

2001
 List
 
Lists of UK MPs 2001–2005
UK MPs